Uddingston railway station serves the town of Uddingston, South Lanarkshire, Scotland. ScotRail provides passenger services to this station on the Argyle Line and Shotts Line.

History

Overview
The first Uddingston station, on the east side of the Glasgow Road bridge, was opened by the Clydesdale Junction Railway on 1 June 1849. In 1878, it was replaced by the second one immediately west of the bridge. The station was renamed Uddingston Central (1952–1962) to avoid confusion with the nearby Uddingston (NB) renamed . The latter closing in 1955, the former reverted to Uddingston in 1962.

Prior to the 2014 Whifflet Line electrification, Argyle Line services provided through links to Central Low Level via  and then onwards to  via  northbound and to Motherwell southbound (alternate services continued to ).

Access & facilities
The building on Station Road, housing various public facilities, leads to Platform 1 (Glasgow-bound trains). A footbridge over the double track connects to Platform 2 (Motherwell/Edinburgh-bound trains) and the car park.

Enhancements
Around 2005, ScotRail, SPT and South Lanarkshire Council funded improvements that included:

 £610,000 investment in more than doubling the number of parking spaces and improving pedestrian access
 installation of an automatic ticket vending machine and renewal of ticketing system within booking office
 the opening of the "Coffee Stop"
 addition of hanging baskets and floral beds through working with the local community
 new station seating both on platforms and within the waiting room
 installation of flat-screen destination displays for both platforms and waiting area
 addition of fully accessible public toilets on Platform 1
 addition of public telephone on Platform 1
 refurbishment of the waiting room on Platform 1 to meet accessibility requirements including automatic doors and accessible ticket counter

Since 2005, a volunteer group has been responsible for beautifying the station precinct with flower beds and hanging baskets.

Free parking attracted commuters from outside the area. The proposal to expand the park and ride facility appears to have been actioned in 2019.

Accidents

1862: A worker at the coal depot was fatally crushed between some trucks and a passing train.

1867: On a westbound collision with the arch of the Glasgow Road bridge, a transported van rolled back into the following carriage, injuring five passengers, two seriously.

After severing his right leg and left foot, he died within hours.

1901: A passing train sliced in two a man on the rail bridge.

1903: A passenger carriage sideswiped a bridge worker. Months later, an eastbound passenger train struck a man.

Eleven passengers received cuts and bruises, and the rolling stock incurred significant damage.

1908: A light engine hit a young man causing near fatal injuries.

1911: Near the Viewpark Colliery signal box, immediately east of Uddingston Junction, a westbound passenger train ran down two surfacemen. One died and the other sustained leg injuries and facial wounds.

1914: A porter seized a passenger, who was boarding a moving train. In the attempt to drag him back, both men dropped between the train and platform. The passenger sustained fractured ribs and the porter minor injuries. The following month, a passing westbound express fatally injured a retired army doctor who fell from the platform.

1920: A passing train decapitated and mutilated a man west of the rail bridge.

1932: Falling between the carriage and the platform, a woman sustained two compound fractures below the knee.

1934: A westbound express fatally injured an LMS employee supervising repairs to the rail bridge.

1936: A passenger who dropped through a carriage window onto the platform, while his train bypassed the station, incurred minor injuries.

1957: On a 12-coach Mid-Day Scot, three of the five derailed units sustained serious damage. On board, one person was killed and five were injured.

2013: An individual experienced leg injuries on being struck by a train.

2014: A cyclist became trapped under a train after riding off the platform edge.

Sidings
A goods yard existed to the north east of Glasgow Rd that included the siding for John Gray & Co.'s Uddingston Iron Works.

Services 

|-
|

|

The hourly (two-hourly Sundays) Shotts Line terminates at Edinburgh Waverley.

East and West Coast Main Line trains pass through the station to/from  but do not stop.

Passengers wishing to reach destinations on the routes via Central Low Level must change at Cambuslang or transfer between the main line and Low Level platforms at Central for onward connections.

Footnotes

References 

 
 

Railway stations in South Lanarkshire
Former Caledonian Railway stations
Railway stations in Great Britain opened in 1849
SPT railway stations
Railway stations served by ScotRail
1849 establishments in Scotland
Bothwell and Uddingston